Quararibea sanblasensis is a species of flowering plant in the family Malvaceae. It is found in Colombia and Panama. It is threatened by habitat loss.

References

sanblasensis
Flora of Colombia
Flora of Panama
Endangered flora of North America
Endangered flora of South America
Taxonomy articles created by Polbot
Taxobox binomials not recognized by IUCN